Presidential elections were held in Austria on 4 May 1986 with a second round on 8 June 1986. Kurt Waldheim, former Secretary-General of the United Nations, endorsed by the Austrian People's Party (ÖVP) was elected, the first time the ÖVP had won a direct presidential election. Following Waldheim's victory, Chancellor Fred Sinowatz and other government members of the defeated Socialist Party stepped down, including the Minister of Foreign Affairs Leopold Gratz, who said he refused to "direct the Austrian foreign service in the defense of President Waldheim." The revelation of Waldheim's service in Greece and Yugoslavia, as an intelligence officer in Nazi Germany's Wehrmacht during World War II, caused international controversy.

Results

References

Presidential elections in Austria
Presiential
Austria
Austria
Political controversies in Austria